HMS Quentin was a Q-class destroyer laid down by J. Samuel White and Company, Limited, at Cowes on the Isle of Wight on 25 September 1940, launched on 5 November 1941 and commissioned on 15 April 1942. She saw service during the Second World War before being sunk in 1942 by German aircraft off North Africa.

Service history
Quentin and the Australian destroyer  depth charged and sank the Italian submarine  Dessiè off Algeria on 28 November 1942. Quentin was torpedoed by German aircraft and sank off North Africa on 2 December 1942 with the loss of 20 men, only hours after participating in the Battle of Skerki Bank.

Notes

References
 
 
 
 
 
 
 
 
 

 

Q and R-class destroyers of the Royal Navy
Ships built on the Isle of Wight
1941 ships
World War II destroyers of the United Kingdom
Destroyers sunk by aircraft
World War II shipwrecks in the Mediterranean Sea
Maritime incidents in December 1942
Ships sunk by German aircraft